Aleksandrs Stradiņš (born 15 October 1968) is a retired Latvian football midfielder.

References

1968 births
Living people
Soviet footballers
Latvian footballers
Skonto FC players
FC Hoverla Uzhhorod players
Dinaburg FC players
FK RFS players
FK Ventspils players
FK Žalgiris players
FK Liepājas Metalurgs players
Association football midfielders
Latvia international footballers
Latvian expatriate footballers
Expatriate footballers in Russia
Latvian expatriate sportspeople in Russia
Expatriate footballers in Ukraine
Latvian expatriate sportspeople in Ukraine
Expatriate footballers in Lithuania
Latvian expatriate sportspeople in Lithuania